Cedar Party is a small town in the Mid North Coast region, located within the Mid-Coast Council local government area of New South Wales, Australia.

At the 2016 census, the town reported a resident population of 364. The median age is 55 and Aboriginal and Torres Strait Islander people account for 5.5% of the population.

The Cedar Party Creek a perennial stream of the Manning River catchment runs through the town.

References

Suburbs of Mid-Coast Council